Bernhard Schmidt (born 20 May 1906 in Magdeburg, died 23 September 2003 in Esslingen am Neckar) was a German microbiologist. He was Professor and Director of the Institute for Infection Control and Medical Microbiology at the Free University of Berlin.

Schmidt studied chemistry and medicine at the University of Munich, and graduated as a physician and earned a doctoral degree in 1932. He undertook residency training in infection control and bacteriology, and earned his Habilitation at the University of Göttingen in 1939. He worked at the Institute for Medical Microbiology and Infection Control at the Goethe University Frankfurt from 1946, and became an adjunct full professor (Außerplanmäßiger Professor) at the Goethe University Frankfurt in 1948.

In 1953 he became Professor Ordinarius of Infection Control and Director of the Institute for Infection Control and Medical Microbiology at the Free University of Berlin. He was additionally director of the Medizinaluntersuchungsamt in Berlin-Wedding. He became Professor Emeritus in 1974.

Honours
Hygieia Medal, 1978

Selected works 
 Die hygienische Bedeutung der zentralen und lokalen Versorgungsanlagen (Lebensmittelversorgung, Wasser, Abwasser, Gas, Elektrizität) im Frieden und im Kriege, 1938
 Die Ernährung des deutschen Volkes unter besonderer Berücksüchtigung der Ernährung seines Heeres, E.S. Mittler, 1939
 Hygienische Gesichtspunkte beim Bau und bei der Einrichtung von Krankenhäusern, 1958

References 

1906 births
2003 deaths
German microbiologists
Academic staff of Goethe University Frankfurt
Academic staff of the Free University of Berlin
Scientists from Magdeburg